American Truck Simulator is a truck simulator game developed and published by SCS Software. It was announced as being in development in September 2013 and unveiled at the E3 2015. It was released on 2 February 2016 for Microsoft Windows, Linux, and macOS. The game is the parallel sequel to Euro Truck Simulator 2, the spiritual successor of 18 Wheels of Steel, and the third installment in the Truck Simulator series. Set in a condensed depiction of United States, the player can drive one of a choice of American-style conventional trucks, visiting various locations across the U.S., picking up a variety of cargos, and delivering them to their destinations.

Since its release, the game has sold over 2 million copies on Steam.

Gameplay 
American Truck Simulator is a truck driving simulator with business management elements.  A beginning player will be directed to found a truck driving business and select a home city from which to operate that business.  Upon selection of the home city, the player will own the pre-placed truck garage located in that city, which will operate as the player's home base.

During gameplay, the player will select from a menu of currently available goods delivery routes to drive one of several models of trailer-hooked truck and deliver the selected load to a designated location within a fixed amount of time.  By making such deliveries, the player earns money for the player's company and experience points for the player themself.  By delivering the selected cargo to its designation within the allotted time and with the least damage to the goods, the player will maximize the amount of money and experience points earned.  Late deliveries or deliveries with damage will result in the player earning reduced cash and experience points.  The amount of money and experience points earned are commensurate to the length of the delivery in distance traveled and type of goods being transported.

A beginning player will own a garage, but no trucks or trailers.  The player will begin by completing "quick jobs," which are goods deliveries that utilize an in-game company's trucks and trailers.  Once the player has earned enough money, the player may then begin purchasing one or more trucks, but the player may continue making "quick job" deliveries if desired.  After purchasing a truck, the player may elect to use the purchased truck for deliveries, or go back to performing quick job deliveries.

As the player completes deliveries, the player will unlock skills by spending experience points to purchase particular skills upgrades.  These upgrade categories include fuel efficiency, route delivery distance, carrying heavy cargo, carrying dangerous goods, carrying fragile cargoes, or making urgent deliveries.

The money earned by the player's company will automatically be used to pay back any company loans the player obtains for the company or to pay any fines incurred in the course of the player's gameplay.  The money is also needed to pay for fuel and maintenance on any vehicles or trailers owned by the player's company.  When performing quick job deliveries using an in-game company's truck, repairs and other costs are paid by that in-game company and not from the funds of the player's company.  The player may also use the company's money to purchase additional trucks and trailers which are held in designated slots in the garage.  

The player may use company funds to hire NPC drivers (and pay their associated expenses), who are placed in additional driver slots in the garage.  Once the player has earned sufficient money, the player may also purchase garages in other cities and hire NPC drivers to drive from those garages, as well.  The longer an NPC driver is employed by the company, the more experience points they will earn, thus increasing the amount of money that driver earns from each delivery.  Much like the player's experience points, the player may direct the focus of each hired driver's experience points, thereby ensuring that particular hired drivers become experts in particular skill areas, such as hauling dangerous goods or performing long-haul deliveries.

Company money may be used to upgrade garages, which will allow the garages to hold additional trucks, trailers, and NPC drivers, as well as place a reduced-cost fueling station at the garage.  The company money may be used to upgrade the company's trucks and trailers, specifically by upgrading their associated aesthetic, mechanical, and structural upgrades.

While driving routes, the game will direct the player to stop at designated weigh stations to determine the weight of the cargo before being permitted to proceed (though the game may occasionally allow the driver to bypass such station).  When crossing the border into the state of California (currently only in the northern part of the state), the player is similarly obliged to stop at California Border Protection Stations to have their vehicle inspected.  Avoiding a weigh station or border protection station will result the player being fined.

Trucks 

SCS Software confirmed in a blog post on 15 February 2016 that the Kenworth W900 has been launched and added to the game. Later, the company confirmed in a blog post that the Peterbilt 579 and the Kenworth T680 will ship with the sim on release day. They also confirmed the Peterbilt 389 on 3 November 2016. Two years later, SCS Software included the Volvo VNL into the game on 5 November 2018. A little over a year later, on 10 December 2019, the CEO of SCS Software confirmed that the International LoneStar would be coming to the game. The LoneStar was released into the game on 12 December 2019. Four months later on 28 April 2020, the Mack Anthem was added to the game, with the Western Star 49X being added to the game 4 months later on 30 September 2020, about one day later after its real-world unveiling. Then three months later on 2 December 2020, the Freightliner Cascadia was added to the game. 

A little less than a year later, on 1 September 2021, SCS added to the International line in game with the International LT, formerly known as the International ProStar, which accompanies the International LoneStar. Three months later, the Freightliner Cascadia received an update with new parts from the 2022 model of the truck. On March 22, 2022, The International 9900i was added to the game. On August 2, 2022, Western Star Trucks unveiled the new Western Star 57X truck, with SCS announcing shortly afterwards that the truck was also available in the game.  Another Western Star truck, the 5700XE, was announced on January 31, 2023. It came with a unique paint job inspired by Optimus Prime from the movie Transformers: Age of Extinction due to Optimus transforming into a 5700XE in his vehicle mode.

Setting 
The game is currently set in a condensed 1:20-scaled version of the entire Western Contiguous and part of the South Central regions in the United States, expanded periodically by the developer through downloadable content. It currently features depictions of the western U.S. states of California, Nevada, Arizona, with New Mexico, Oregon, Washington, Utah, Idaho, Colorado, Wyoming, Montana and Texas available as DLCs. The game features 180 visitable cities, including most state capitals and major cities, as well as many thousands of miles worth of in-game roads. Currently, the player may travel as far north as Bellingham, Washington, as far south as Brownsville, Texas, as far west as Eureka, California, and as far east as Beaumont, Texas, assuming the player has all the states available to them. SCS have stated that most future map expansions, if not all, will be at additional cost. 
The modding community for American Truck Simulator have also created their own map extensions. The most popular of these extensions include cities in each state, Mexico, and Canada, though the majority of these maps, with some exceptions, are generally not as dense with roads as the base game nor regarded by the community as high quality or detailed. Some modded maps redo older sections of the map with their own areas, regarded as higher quality than the vanilla game. These old areas are generally considered to be out-of-date by the community, with lower design standards than SCS Software's map content with the exception of northern California and Las Vegas as of version 1.44.

States 

The game started off at launch with the U.S. states of California and Nevada, and expanded from there, with Arizona being added in June 2016 as a free update. A number of other states like Utah have now been added as paid DLC:

Development 
SCS Software announced the game on 6 September 2013. It was revealed at E3 in 2015.

On 11 April 2014, SCS Software announced that there will be 100+ cities in the game once completed (not initially), and SCS released screenshots of the game. Truck brands included on American Truck Simulator so far are Kenworth, Peterbilt, Volvo, International Trucks, Western Star, Mack and Freightliner. More will follow; the only setback remains the licensing of trucks from their manufacturers. SCS plans to eventually include the entire contiguous United States, as long as the game continues to do well. On 26 January 2015, SCS Software published a one-hour video to YouTube of footage from early alpha of the game. On 18 December 2015, SCS Software announced the official release date for American Truck Simulator, 3 February 2016, on their blog. The game was released one day earlier instead.

The game was released for PC-DVD on 14 December 2017.

Reception 

American Truck Simulator has received mostly positive reviews from critics, scoring 76/100 on Metacritic.

James Cunningham of Hardcore Gamer gave the game a 4 out of 5 saying, "While a little more realism would make American Truck Simulator more fun, paradoxical as that may sound, there’s no escaping how fantastically playable it is." Laura Dale from Polygon rated the game a 8/10 saying, "As someone who sunk countless hours into Euro Truck Simulator 2, a fresh coat of paint, an unfamiliar set of sights and the challenge of driving on the wrong opposite side of the road left me confident that I'll be sinking just as many hours into American Truck Simulator."

Andy Kelly of PC Gamer commended the game and noted that it shared the strengths and shortcomings of its predecessor due to the two games' similarities, though advised that it was not finished on launch and urged more cautious gamers to wait until it was more completed before purchasing the game.

American Truck Simulator won Best technological solution at the 2016 Czech Game of the Year Awards, and was also nominated for Best Game, Best PC/Console Game, and Best Audio.

References

External links 
 

2016 video games
Linux games
MacOS games
SCS Software games
Video games developed in the Czech Republic
Video games set in the United States
Windows games
Truck simulation video games
Video games with Steam Workshop support
Multiplayer and single-player video games